The General Secretary of the Central Committee of the Communist Party of Kampuchea was the  highest office in the Communist Party of Kampuchea (CPK). The General Secretary was elected at plenary sessions of the party's Central Committee, and chaired the Secretariat and Politburo. The office was abolished when the CPK dissolved in 1981, two years after being removed from power in the Vietnamese invasion of Cambodia.

General secretaries

See also 

 Agrarian socialism
 Communist Youth League of Kampuchea
 Party of Democratic Kampuchea

References

Democratic Kampuchea
Khmer Rouge